Svetlana Borisovna Bezrodnaya (nee Levina, born 12 February 1934, Barvikha, USSR) is a Soviet and Russian violinist and conductor. Artistic director of the State Academic Chamber Vivaldi-orchestra. She was awarded of People's Artist of Russia in 1996.

References

External links
  Svetlana Bezrodnaya on biletexpress.ru
 Посвящение героям: концерт «Вивальди-оркестра»

1934 births
Living people
People from Odintsovsky District
Soviet violinists
20th-century violinists
Russian violinists
Soviet conductors (music)
Russian music educators
People's Artists of Russia
Honored Artists of the RSFSR
20th-century Russian conductors (music)
21st-century Russian conductors (music)
21st-century violinists
Recipients of the Order "For Merit to the Fatherland", 4th class